Richard Fairfax Hamill (September 9, 1894 – December 7, 1975) was an American football and basketball coach. He served as the head football coach (1920–1921) and head basketball coach (1918–1923) at his alma mater, Davis & Elkins College in Elkins, West Virginia.

He also served as the head football coach (1919) and head men's basketball coach (1916–1917) at Glenville State College, as well as serving as the head football coach at Fairmont State College from 1922 to 1923.

References

External links
 

1894 births
1975 deaths
Basketball coaches from West Virginia
Davis & Elkins College alumni
Davis & Elkins Senators football coaches
Davis & Elkins Senators men's basketball coaches
Fairmont State Fighting Falcons football coaches
Glenville State Pioneers football coaches
Glenville State Pioneers basketball coaches
People from Elkins, West Virginia